Guj may refer to:
 Guz, an obsolete unit of length
 Gujarat Airways
 Gujarati language